Sousa Esporte Clube, commonly known as Sousa, is a Brazilian football team based in Sousa, Paraíba state. They competed in the Série C and in the Copa do Brasil three times.

Sousa is currently ranked fourth among Paraíba teams in CBF's national club ranking, at 143rd place overall.

History
The club was founded on July 10, 1991. Sousa won the Campeonato Paraibano Second Level in 1991, and the Campeonato Paraibano in 1994 and in 2009. They competed in the Série C in 1994, when they eliminated in the Second Stage by CSA. Sousa competed in the Copa do Brasil for the first time in 1995, when they were eliminated in the preliminary round by Flamengo. They competed in  the Série C in 1995, when they were eliminated in the Third Stage by Icasa. The club was eliminated in Third Stage by Sergipe in the 2003 Série C. Sousa competed again in the Copa do Brasil in 2008, when they were eliminated in the first round by Vitória. The club competed in the Copa do Brasil in 2010, when they were eliminated in the first round by Vasco.

Achievements

 Campeonato Paraibano:
 Winners (2): 1994, 2009
 Campeonato Paraibano Second Level:
 Winners (1): 1991

Stadium
Sousa Esporte Clube play their home games at Estádio Governador Antônio Mariz, nicknamed Marizão. The stadium has a maximum capacity of 10,000 people.

References

Association football clubs established in 1991
Football clubs in Paraíba
1991 establishments in Brazil